Iznoski is a rural locality (a selo) and the administrative center of Iznoskovsky District, Kaluga Oblast, Russia. Population:

References

Notes

Sources

Rural localities in Kaluga Oblast